Matthew Lynn (born 1962) is a British thriller writer, financial journalist and publisher. He is the author of the Death Force series of novels. He has also written under the name James Harland.

Early life 
Lynn was born in 1962 and grew up in Exeter and Dublin, before moving to London. He was educated at Balliol College, Oxford.

Career

Economist 
Lynn writes on business and economics, including columns in Bloomberg News, MoneyWeek and The Spectator.

For most of the 1990s, he worked for The Sunday Times, for the last three years as a profile columnist. 

His book Four Walls Eight Windows (ECON, 1997) was reviewed by Library Journal, which wrote, "Lynn's treatment of the political, industrial, and social turmoil surrounding the sale to major carriers of a stable of aircraft of various payloads and ranges has all the intrigue and skullduggery of a spy novel".

Lynn wrote two business books, The Billion-Dollar Battle: Merck v. Glaxo and Birds of Prey: Boeing v. Airbus. The latter received a largely positive review from Publishers Weekly, while Kirkus Reviews noted Lynn "writes serviceable prose at best". 

In a 2007 Bloomberg article, Matt Lynn predicted that Apple Inc. "…will sell a few to its fans, but the iPhone won't make a long-term mark on the industry".

He is the author of Bust: Greece, the Euro and the Sovereign Debt Crisis, published in late 2010, and more recently, The Long Depression: The Slump of 2008 to 2031 (Endeavour Press). His articles and opinions have been used as references by other authors and researchers.<ref>{{cite book|author= Sternad, Dietmar|title=Effective Management|year=2019|isbn=9781352007305|url=https://books.google.com/books?id=Hie7DwAAQBAJ&q=%22matthew+Lynn%22+book+review&pg=PA382|access-date=28 June 2020}} </ref> Bust was reviewed in CHOICE: Current Reviews for Academic Libraries as follows: "books on economics and international finance rarely provide an exciting, gripping read" and called it "highly recommended".

In 2012, Lynn was chief executive of Strategy Economics, a London-based consultancy. His "London Eye" column began appearing weekly in MarketWatch in June 2011.

 Novelist 
As James Harland, he published The Month of the Leopard in 2001. Kirkus Reviews wrote, "Tension, pitifully lacking in the first two thirds of this grand adventure for MBAs, finally arrives, but nonbankers will probably have bailed out by then". Publishers Weekly noted, "There are problems: flat characterizations, gratuitous violence, unconvincing motivation for Telmont and a too-hasty denouement. But the book is a page-turner for anyone interested in high-stakes financial shenanigans".

He started writing the Death Force series of action-adventure thrillers in 2009. Featuring a group of mercenaries, the series includes Death Force, Fire Force and Shadow Force. The News of the World gave the first book a four-starred rating, describing it as “a Boy's-Own adventure guaranteed to get the pulse racing. It is up there with the finest that Andy McNab or Chris Ryan have ever penned.”

In 2018, Lynn set up Endeavour Media, an independent publisher based in London. It became Lume Books in 2020.

Controversy
When trying to promote his book The Watchmen'', Lynn offered the first chapter for free on the website Motley Fool UK. However users on the website objected to his unusual method of publicity and Lynn had to back off.

Personal life

He has three children, Isabella, Leonora, and Claudia.

References

External links
 Strategy Economics official website

1962 births
British thriller writers
Living people
British columnists
Alumni of Balliol College, Oxford
The Daily Telegraph people
British business and financial journalists
British publishers (people)
The Sunday Times people